The Latinitas Foundation was an organisation dedicated to furthering the education of Latin and the publication of articles in the language. It was established on 30 June 1976 by Pope Paul VI and was superseded by the Pontifical Academy for Latin (Pontificia Academia Latinitatis) which was established on 10 November 2012 by Pope Benedict XVI.

References

External links

Latin language
Organizations based in Vatican City
1976 establishments in Europe
2012 disestablishments in Europe